Lloyd Motoren Werke G.m.b.H. (Lloyd Engine Works) was a German automobile manufacturer, created in 1908 and owned by the Norddeutscher Lloyd shipping company. The factory was in Bremen. The company operated under a variety of different names throughout the decades, but their products were nearly always badged with the Lloyd marque. Originally a manufacturer of luxury cars, the company was folded into the Borgward Group in 1929, with the brand no longer used on passenger cars until 1950. Production ended for good in 1963, although a successor company continued trading until 1989, selling replacement parts and also manufacturing engines for snowmobiles and boats.

The German Lloyd marque had no connection with the British Lloyd Cars Ltd company active between 1936 and 1951.

1908–1937

The first cars were licence-built Kriéger electric vehicles. Petrol-engined models followed in 1908 with 3685 cc engines, but few were made. The Belgian electrical engineer, Paul Mossay, was employed for four years as chief engineer, designing both engines and electric vehicles. In 1914 the company merged with Hansa to become Hansa-Lloyd Werke AG. The company changed names and badging on a number of occasions and were never on a sound financial footing. Most of the Hansa/Lloyd cars made during this period were sold as Hansa with the Hansa-Lloyd name mainly attached to commercial vehicles, with the exception of the Treff-Aß and the Trumpf-Aß. The company was integrated in the Borgward group after the purchase of Hansa by Carl F. W. Borgward in 1929, and car production ceased.

Until 1937, the Hansa-Lloyd brand was used on a number of commercial vehicles (trucks and buses), from the one-ton "Express" to the five-ton "Merkur". They were largely replaced by Borgward-branded vehicles, with a few models sold with just "Hansa" badging in 1938.

1950–1963

Lloyd as a standalone name only entered mass-production of cars and light trucks in 1950 with the company becoming Lloyd Motoren Werke GmbH – still in Bremen. The very first cars (the Lloyd 300) were wood and fabric bodied. Thin, rolled steel gradually replaced the original fabric shell between 1953 and 1954 (Lloyd 400), however wood framing was still used within the doors and elsewhere.

The Lloyd 250 was called "Prüfungsangst-Lloyd" ("Lloyd for exam nerves") as they appealed to owners of older driving licenses who could drive it without having to pass a new driving test for cars with a cubic capacity of over 250 cc, a test which was introduced in a legal reform of the mid-1950s. With a power of only 11 PS (DIN), the Lloyd's designers saw a need for saving weight, and thus offered the LP 250 without a back seat, bumpers, hub caps or trims. However, most buyers ordered the LP 250 V with these features as optional extras.

Overall, the vehicles matched the need for small and cheap cars which were a characteristic of post-war Germany, and they provided a comparatively high standard in comfort and reliability. They rose to third place in the annual licensing statistics for several years in the 1950s, behind only Volkswagen and Opel. In spite of this success, there was little prestige to be gained by driving a Lloyd. In the vernacular, the Lloyd 300 was called "Leukoplastbomber" due to the owners' habit of repairing nicks in the fabric of the body with sticking plaster called Leukoplast. A contemporary derisive verse went "Wer den Tod nicht scheut, fährt Lloyd" ("He who is not afraid of death, drives a Lloyd").

Pietro Frua designed a coupé on the basis of the Lloyd Alexander; it was presented at the Turin Motor Show in November 1958.

The parent company failed in 1961 but cars were still made up to 1963. By this time, the LP 900 was named "Borgward Arabella" instead of "Lloyd Arabella".

Models

Australian production – The Lloyd-Hartnett
The Lloyd 600 was assembled in Australia by a company formed as joint venture between Carl Borgward and Laurence Hartnett in the late 1950s. The car was introduced in December 1957 as the Lloyd-Hartnett and a total of 3000 cars were built before production ceased in 1962.

References

External links

 The Lloyd Cars English HomePage
 LLOYD-FREUNDE-IG Deutschland
 Lloyd & Borgward
 Borgward history
 Lloyd Alexander Frua (Ghia Aigle) Coupé

Defunct motor vehicle manufacturers of Germany
First car made by manufacturer
Borgward